San Onofre is a town and municipality located in the Sucre Department, northern Colombia.

References
 Gobernacion de Sucre - San Onofre
 San Onofre official website

Sucre